The SK Golf Challenge was a golf tournament on the Challenge Tour played in Finland. It was founded in 2008, and in 2010 was retitled as the Green Challenge before being cancelled due to the withdrawal of a major sponsor.

Winners

References

External links
Coverage on the Challenge Tour's official site

Former Challenge Tour events
Golf tournaments in Finland